Riehle is a surname. Notable people with the surname include:

Ben A. Riehle (1897–1967), American politician
Friedemann Riehle (born 1959), German conductor
Helen Riehle (born 1950), American politician
Richard Riehle (born 1948), American actor

English-language surnames